Sphaerodactylus rhabdotus, also known as the two-striped sphaero or Valle de Neiba least gecko, is a small species of gecko endemic to the Dominican Republic.

References

Sphaerodactylus
Endemic fauna of the Dominican Republic
Reptiles of the Dominican Republic
Reptiles described in 1970
Taxa named by Albert Schwartz (zoologist)